Pont-Croix is a commune in the Finistère department of Brittany in north-western France.

International relations
It is twinned with the civil Parish of Constantine in Kerrier, Cornwall.

Population
Inhabitants of Pont-Croix are called in French Pontécruciens.

Sights
From Pont-Croix, short trips can be made to Pointe du Raz, Pointe du Van, and Baie des Trépassés. On the road to Audierne, one can enjoy a marvelous view of the Goyen river valley.

The Monastery Church of Notre-Dame de Roscudon, which dates from the early 13th century, has a 67 m high spire that served as the model for the spires of Quimper Cathedral.

Pont-Croix's cobbled streets (Ruelles pavées) and medieval houses are located around a market and a church.  The market is held every Thursday morning.

Other points of interest are:
 The Bridge over the River Goyen
 The Chapel of Saint Vincent

Notable people 

 Louise Magadur

See also
Communes of the Finistère department

References

The information in this article is based on a translation of its German equivalent.

External links

Mayors of Finistère Association 

Communes of Finistère
Populated coastal places in France